James H. Meyer, known as 'Jim' Meyer, was a Republican member of the Illinois House of Representatives from 1993 until his retirement at the end of his term in January 2009.

Biography
Meyer received a Bachelor of Arts in political science and history from Upper Iowa University. He served in the Vietnam War as a member of the United States Air Force. He served as a deputy mayor and village trustee of Bolingbrook, as a member of Congressman Harris Fawell's science and technology advisory committee and as a vice president of the northern Illinois chapter of the Cystic Fibrosis Foundation.

Illinois House of Representatives
In the 1992 general election, Meyer was elected to represent the 82nd district.

References

External links
Illinois General Assembly - Representative James H. Meyer (R) 48th District official IL House website
Bills Committees
Project Vote Smart - Representative James H. 'Jim' Meyer (IL) profile
Follow the Money - James H (Jim) Meyer
2006 2004 2002 2000 1998 1996 campaign contributions

Republican Party members of the Illinois House of Representatives
1943 births
Living people
21st-century American politicians
People from Sibley, Iowa